Samuel Kahuma (called Sam) is an Anglican bishop in Uganda: since 2016 he has been the Bishop of Bunyoro-Kitara.

Kahuma was educated at Uganda Christian University and the University of Gloucestershire; and ordained a deacon in 1990 and a priest in 1991. He has served in Kibingo;  Hoima, where he was Archdeacon; and Duhaga where he was Dean of St. Peter's Cathedral. His last post was as Diocesan Secretary of Bunyoro-Kitara.

He was consecrated and enthroned on 4 December 2016.

References

21st-century Anglican bishops in Uganda
Anglican bishops of Bunyoro-Kitara
Alumni of the University of Gloucestershire
Uganda Christian University alumni
Anglican archdeacons in Africa
Anglican deans in Africa
Year of birth missing (living people)
Living people